Guatavita is a municipality and town of Colombia in the Guavio Province of the department of Cundinamarca. Guatavita is located 75 km northeast of the capital Bogotá. It borders Sesquilé and Machetá in the north, Gachetá and Junín in the east, Guasca in the south and in the west are Tocancipá and Gachancipá.

History 
Before the Spanish conquest of the Muisca on the Altiplano Cundiboyacense, the central plateau in the Colombian Andes, the area was inhabited by the Muisca organized in their Muisca Confederation. Guatavita was ruled by a cacique who was a powerful figure consulted by the zipas of Bacatá and the zaques of Hunza. Guatavita was specialized in gold working. An important temple honouring Sué, the Sun god in the religion of the Muisca was constructed in Guatavita.

In the Guatavita Lake the new zipa was inaugurated in rituals performed by the cacique of Guatavita, represented by the famous golden Muisca raft. Around 1490 the Battle of Chocontá took place where zaque Michuá was supported by the cacique of Guatavita and lost with their outnumbered army of 60,000 guecha warriors against the zipa Saguamanchica. Both Muisca rulers died in this battle.

Modern Guatavita was founded on March 18, 1593 by Miguel de Ibarra.

Guatavita was rebuilt on higher ground in the mid 1960s due to the construction of the Tominé Reservoir, which intentionally flooded the area of the town.

Etymology 
In the Chibcha language of the Muisca, Guachetá means "end of the farming fields" or "point of the mountain range".

Economy 
Main economical activities in Guatavita are agriculture, mining and tourism. In terms of agriculture most common are potatoes, maize, barley and peas. Tourism is mainly in the weekends when craft markets open in town.

Guatavita Lake 
The sacred and ceremonial Lake Guatavita, of the pre-Columbian Muisca is located nearby, within the Sesquilé municipality of Almeidas Province.

Gallery

References

External links 

 Photos of Guatavita 
  Nature and Culture of Guatavita

Municipalities of Cundinamarca Department
Populated places established in 1593
1593 establishments in the Spanish Empire
Muisca Confederation
Muysccubun